John Swanson  may refer to:

 John Swanson (Medal of Honor) (1842–1923), American Civil War sailor and Medal of Honor recipient
 John Swanson (cricketer) (born 1940), Australian cricketer
 John Swanson (bridge), American bridge player and writer
 John August Swanson (born 1938), American visual artist
 John A. Swanson, American engineer, entrepreneur, and philanthropist
 Jon E. Swanson (1942–1971), United States Army officer and Medal of Honor recipient
 Johnny Swanson, candidate in the United States Senate election in Alabama, 2008
 Johnny Swanson, novel by Eleanor Updale